Max Johann Bernhard Koner (17 July 1854, Berlin –  7 July 1900, Berlin) was a German portraitist.

Biography 

From 1873 to 1878, he studied at the Prussian Academy of Arts under Eduard Daege,  Anton von Werner and others. He spent some time in Italy in 1875 and, after graduating went to study in Paris. In 1893, he became a member of the Academy.

Originally devoted to landscape painting, he switched to figure painting and, finally, to portraits. Between 1888 and his death, he completed over 100 portraits, including thirty of Kaiser Wilhelm II, beginning in 1890, depicting him in various uniforms. In 1894, one of those portraits was awarded a gold medal at the "Große Berliner Kunstausstellung", a prestigious exhibition held from 1893 to 1969.

In 1886, he married one of his students, Sophie Schäffer, who also became a noted portrait painter; primarily of children.

For several years, he served as a member of the committee that selected artists for the popular trading cards issued by the Stollwerck chocolate company. 

It was won by Fritz Klimsch who created a profile of the artist above two women in mourning dress. The monument has not been preserved.

Among his most notable portraits may be numbered those of Adolph von Menzel (1890 and 1895), Andreas Achenbach (1890), Emil Du Bois-Reymond (1890), Anton von Werner   (1890), Ernst Curtius (1890), Johannes von Miquel (1893), Eugen Bracht (1894),  Georg von Kameke (1894) and Herbert von Bismarck (1899)

References

Further reading 
 Max Jordan: Koner, Velhagen & Klasings Künstlermonographien, 1901
 Irmgard Wirth: Berliner Malerei im 19. Jahrhundert. Siedler Verlag, Berlin 1990, S. 347.

External links 

1854 births
1900 deaths
19th-century German painters
19th-century German male artists
German male painters
German portrait painters
Prussian Academy of Arts alumni
Academic staff of the Prussian Academy of Arts
Artists from Berlin